Larry K. Michaelsen is a David Ross Boyd Professor Emeritus of Management at the University of Oklahoma. He is also a Professor Emeritus at the University of Central Missouri, a Carnegie Scholar, a Fulbright Senior Scholar, and former Editor of the Journal of Management Education.

References 

Living people
University of Oklahoma faculty
University of Central Missouri faculty
Academic journal editors
Business educators
Year of birth missing (living people)